This is a list of newspapers in Mongolia.

Aphrodite (Афродита) (Ulaanbaatar)
Great Nation (Их үндэстэн) (Ulaanbaatar)
The Mongol Messenger (in English) (Ulaanbaatar)
Mongolia This Week (in English)
Niigmiin Toli (Нийгмийн толь) (Ulaanbaatar/national) - Society's Brief
UB Post (in English) (Ulaanbaatar)
Udriin Sonin (Өдрийн сонин) (Ulaanbaatar/national) - Day's Newspaper
Unuudur (Өнөөдөр) (Ulaanbaatar/national) - Today
Zuunii Medee (Зууны мэдээ) (Ulaanbaatar/national) - Century's News

Below is a list of magazines published in Mongolia.

Computer Times (Компьютер Таймс) (Ulaanbaatar/national)
Goo Mongol (Гоо монгол) (Ulaanbaatar/national) - Beautiful/nice Mongol
Gyalbaa (Гялбаа) (Ulaanbaatar/national) - Bright
Polar Star (Алтангадас) (Ulaanbaatar/national)
Uptown (Аптаун) (Ulaanbaatar/national)
Step by Step (Ulaanbaatar/national)

See also
Media of Mongolia
List of newspapers

Mongolia
Newspapers